Mexican rice (sometimes referred to as Spanish rice or red rice in Tex-Mex cuisine), also known as arroz a la mexicana, arroz mexicano, or arroz rojo in Spanish, is a Mexican side dish made from white rice, tomato, garlic, onion, and perhaps other ingredients. Mexican rice is almost always eaten as a complement to other dishes such as mole, refried beans, rotisserie chicken, carne asada, picadillo, tacos, fried fish, fried chicken, chiles rellenos, or vegetable soup.

Mexican-style rice is especially popular in central and northern Mexico and the southwestern United States. It is eaten year-round and is one of the most common preparations in Mexican cuisine.

Preparation 
Mexican rice is prepared by rinsing and briefly soaking medium grained white rice and then toasting the rice in a heavy saucepan with fat, such as lard or cooking oil. After the grains of rice start to turn golden and translucent, tomato, onion, and garlic are all blended in either chicken broth, vegetable stock or a solution of water and chicken soup flavoring to make a sauce which is added to the toasted rice grains, where the mixture is brought to a simmer and briefly stirred and covered for 15–20 minutes, until the rice absorbs all of the liquid and becomes soft.

If the Mexican rice includes chopped vegetables such as carrot, corn, or pea, the vegetables are usually added while the rice is being toasted in the oil, before adding tomato sauce or broth, to get them soft and cooked well, and they can be seasoned with salt, finely chopped coriander, and/or ground cumin. In terms of spices and herbs, parsley can be added to give it a little color but it does not change the flavor much and cilantro adds a unique flavor and can be substituted for parsley or added as a complementary fresh herb. Cumin, oregano, cayenne, and chili powder can be added to the tomato sauce blend to give it a unique flavor.

Naming and etymology

The term "Spanish rice" is sometimes used in the context of Tex-Mex cuisine, but is not used by Mexicans or Spaniards since this recipe is not part of Spanish cuisine, although it can be considered a simplified version of Spain's  (with tomato rather than saffron, turmeric, or calendula, and thus having a red rather than yellow color). It has been theorized that the name "Spanish rice" was given because Mexicans speak Spanish and make this rice dish, thus causing the language of the country to be incorporated into the name.

Other names associated with this dish are "" (Mexican rice) and "" (Mexican-style rice).

See also
 Jambalaya
 Jollof rice
 Paella
 Pilaf
 Fried rice
 Rice and beans
 Rice and peas

References

External links

Arroz: Spanish Rice at Food Network
Spanish Rice at MarthaStewart.com

Cuisine of the Southern United States
Cuisine of the Southwestern United States
Mexican rice dishes
Tex-Mex cuisine
American rice dishes